VISCA may refer to:
 Visayas State University
 VISCA Protocol